Robert Livingston may refer to:

Robert Livingston the Elder (1654–1728), New York colonial official, fur trader, and businessman 
Robert Livingston the Younger (1663–1725), American mayor
Robert Livingston (1688–1775), Member of New York colonial assembly
Robert Livingston (1708–1790), third lord of Livingston Manor
Robert Livingston (1718–1775), landowner and politician in Colonial America 
Robert R. Livingston (1746–1813), American lawyer, politician, diplomat and Founding Father 
SS Robert R. Livingston, a Liberty ship 
Robert Le Roy Livingston (1778–1836), U.S. Representative from New York
Robert James Livingston (1811–1891), American businessman
Robert Reginald Livingston (1888–1962), American politician and farmer from New York
Robert Livingston (Zen teacher) (born 1933), American Zen teacher
Robert Livingston (actor) (1904–1988), American actor
Robert Livingston (scientist) (1918–2002), American physician and neuroscientist
Robert Livingston (ice hockey) (1908–1974), American ice hockey player
Robert Gilbert Livingston, American merchant and Loyalist
Bob Livingston (born 1943), American politician and lobbyist
Bob Livingston (musician) (born 1948), Texas musician

See also
Robert Livingstone (disambiguation)